The Career and Technology Education Centers of Licking County (C-TEC) is a public school with a focus is on preparing high school 11th & 12th graders to be career and college ready. It also has an Adult Education center located on campus that has 15 full time occupational programs and numerous short term classes available.

Notes and references

External links 
 C-TEC's Website

High schools in Licking County, Ohio
Public high schools in Ohio